Grbavica may refer to:

Grbavica (Novi Sad), a quarter of the city Novi Sad in Serbia
Grbavica (Sarajevo), a quarter of the city Sarajevo in Bosnia and Herzegovina
Grbavica (film), a movie by Jasmila Žbanić. Golden Bear winner at the 56th Berlin International Film Festival in 2006
Grbavica Stadium, a football stadium in Sarajevo
Grbavica (Brčko), a quarter of the city Brčko in Bosnia and Herzegovina
Grbavica (song), a song performed by Mladen Vojičić Tifa and associated with the soccer team FK Željezničar Sarajevo